Yueyang, formerly known as Yuezhou or Yochow, is a prefecture-level city on the eastern shores of Dongting Lake and Yangtze in the northeastern corner of Hunan Province in the People's Republic of China.

The population was 5,051,922 at the 2020 Chinese census whom 1,134,058 lived in the built-up (or metro) area made up of Yueyanglou District and Yunxi District, Junshan District not being conurbated. Yueyang is the only international trade port city in Hunan and a famous port city in China, at the same time, Yueyang's comprehensive economic strength ranks of Hunan second only to Changsha, the provincial capital.

The city's most famous attractions are the Yueyang Tower and Dongting Lake. The most famous food is Dongting lake silver fish.

In 2021, the city's permanent resident population was 5,051,922, a decrease of 424,162 from the end of last year.

Administration
The Yueyang prefecture is made up of six outlying districts, two special districts and the city proper. The six city districts are Huarong, Linxiang, Xiangyin, Pingjiang, Miluo and Yueyang County. The two special (smaller) districts are Junshan and Yunxi, which used to be part of Yueyang city proper but were separated into their own special districts for administrative purposes.

Districts:
Yueyanglou District
Junshan District
Yunxi District
County-level City:
Miluo City 	
Linxiang City 
Counties:	
Yueyang County 	
Huarong County 	
Xiangyin County 	
Pingjiang County

Climate

History
The area now called Yueyang has been inhabited for over 3,000 years.  It was originally established as a prefecture called Hanchang (Hanchang) by Sun Wu in 210 AD during the Three Kingdoms period. It was called Ximi during the Spring and Autumn period and Warring States period under the Chu state.

Under the Song Dynasty (AD 960-AD 1279) it was heavily fortified, with walls  in circumference, and became the seat of the military prefecture of Yueyang, whence its present name. During the Taiping Rebellion, its capture by the rebels in AD 1852 was an important stage in their advance up the Yangtze River valley to Nanjing. At the time of the foundation of the Republic of China in AD 1911, it became a county, taking the name Yueyang.

Yueyang Tower

Yueyang Tower is an ancient Chinese tower in Yueyang, Hunan Province, on the shore of Lake Dongting. Alongside the Pavilion of Prince Teng and Yellow Crane Tower, it is one of the Three Great Towers of Jiangnan, and attracts many tourists. It is a famous place for tourism.

Government

The current CPC Party Secretary of Yueyang is Wang Yi'ou and the current Mayor is Li Aiwu.

Transportation
Yueyang has two Yangtze River crossings, the Jingyue Yangtze River Bridge and Dongting Lake Bridge.

The city is served by Yueyang Sanhe Airport.

Education
There are a total of six colleges and polytechnic schools and several medical schools, the largest of which is Hunan Institute of Science and Technology.

Other colleges include:
 Hunan Polytechnic
 Radio and TV University Yueyang
 National Institute of Occupational Hunan
 Hunan petrochemical Vocational and Technical College
 Yueyang Vocational and Technical College

Schools:
 The No.1 Middle School of the City of Yueyang (key provincial)http://www.yysyz.com.cn/
 The No. 2 Middle School of the City of Yueyang
 The No. 3 Middle School of the City of Yueyang
 The No. 4 Middle School of the City of Yueyang
 The High School of Yueyang City
 The No. 6 Middle School of the City of Yueyang
 The No. 7 Middle School of the City of Yueyang (Music School of the City of Yueyang)
 The No. 8 Middle School of the City of Yueyang
 The No. 9 Middle School of the City of Yueyang
 The No. 10 Middle School of the City of Yueyang
 The No. 11 Middle School of the City of Yueyang (secondary school Yueyang Financial, in 1990 Technical School)
 The No. 12 Middle School of the City of Yueyang
 Changlian Middle School (key provincial)
 The Yuehua Middle School (key provincial)
 Middle School of the City of Miluo (key provincial)
 The No.19 Middle School of the City of Yueyang
The No.1 Middle School of Huarong (key provincial)

Secondary Vocational Schools
 Yueyang City Ahafo language 1,193,280.20
 Zhongshan Yueyang City School Finance
 Pok Man Foreign Languages School
 Huarong County Vocational Schools
 Yueyang County Vocational Schools
 Great Wall vocational schools

Primary Schools
 Yueyang Tower Primary
 Nanhu Primary
 Dongfanghong Primary
 Chaoyang Primary
 Fengshu Primary
 Qi Jia Primary

International relations

Twin towns — sister cities
Yueyang is twinned with:

  Numazu, Shizuoka Prefecture, Japan (1985)
  Titusville, Florida, United States (1988)  
  Castlegar, British Columbia, Canada (1992)  
  Stara Zagora, Bulgaria (1994.12.04)  
  City of Cockburn, Western Australia, Australia (1998)

References

External links

 Official Yueyang Government Website
 https://www.travelchinaguide.com/cityguides/hunan/yueyang/
 Scenic Area of Yueyang Tower-Junshan Islet

 
Cities in Hunan
Populated places on the Yangtze River
Prefecture-level divisions of Hunan